Dog allergy may refer to:
Allergies in dogs
Allergy to dogs